This is a list of every player to have at least played one senior VFL/AFL game for Melbourne Football Club since the inception of the VFL, of which Melbourne was a foundation club, in 1897.

Players are listed in order of debut. The start of their Melbourne Football Club career is determined from when they were first listed at the club, and the end is determined by the final year they were listed at Melbourne. Players are numbered by their debut order for the club; when multiple players debuted during the same match, they are numbered according to the alphabetical order of their surnames.

Melbourne Football Club players

1890s

1900s

1910s

1920s

1930s

1940s

1950s

1960s

1970s

1980s

1990s

2000s

2010s

Other players

Listed players yet to make their debut for Melbourne

Listed players who did not play a senior game for Melbourne

References 
General

 
 
 

Specific

Players

Lists of players of Australian rules football
Melbourne sport-related lists